Jasmin Schornberg (born 7 April 1986) is a German slalom canoeist who has competed at the international level since 2001.

She won 11 medals at the ICF Canoe Slalom World Championships with four golds (K1: 2009, K1 team: 2007, 2017, 2022), three silvers (K1 team: 2010, 2013, 2018) and four bronzes (K1: 2013; K1 team: 2006, 2009, 2011).

She is the overall World Cup champion in K1 from 2007. She also won 10 medals in the European Championships (5 golds, 3 silvers and 2 bronzes).

Schornberg finished 5th in the K1 event at the 2012 Summer Olympics in London.

World Cup individual podiums

References

12 September 2009 results of the women's K1 team finals at the 2009 ICF Canoe Slalom World Championships. – accessed 12 September 2009.
13 September 2009 final results of the women's K1 event at the 2009 ICF Canoe Slalom World Championships. – accessed 13 September 2009.

External links

German female canoeists
Living people
1986 births
Canoeists at the 2012 Summer Olympics
Olympic canoeists of Germany
People from Lippstadt
Sportspeople from Arnsberg (region)
Medalists at the ICF Canoe Slalom World Championships
20th-century German women
21st-century German women